Katzie First Nation is an Indigenous band located in the Lower Fraser Valley in British Columbia, Canada. They are part of the Sto:lo Coast Salish group of peoples, historically referred to by European settlers as Fraser River Indians or Fraser Salish. Their band government is the Katzie First Nation, which does not belong to either of the two Sto:lo tribal councils.

Language
həṅq̓əmín̓əḿ, the downriver dialect of Halkomelem, is still spoken by Katzie peoples, despite colonization attempts (including the Canadian Residential School System). Halkomelem is one of the Coast Salish or Salishan languages.

Lands and governance
Traditional Katzie territory includes the entire Pitt watershed, including the Alouette watershed, the Fraser River and lands adjacent down to Point Roberts, and lands between the Fraser and Boundary Bay. There are approximately 592 members of the Katzie First Nation (their Indian Act-mandated government), and 302 are currently living on their five reserves.

Origins
The Katzie once comprised five communities in the region, each with its own founding chief and which, according to the Katzie, were the foundation of other peoples in the region, notably the Musqueam and Kwantlen. Oe’lecten and his people were based at what is now known as Pitt Lake, Swaneset at Sheridan Hill, Xwoe’pecten at Port Hammond (whose descendants became the Kwantlen), Smakwec at Point Roberts (whose people, the Snokomish were largely killed in a smallpox epidemic in the 18th century), and C’simlenexw at Point Grey (whose descendants became the Musqueam). Today's Katzie are primarily the descendants of Oe’lecten and Swaneset.

External links
Katzie First Nation website
History of the Katzie people, Maple Ridge history website

Sto:lo
Lower Mainland